"You Drive Me Crazy" is a song by Welsh rock and roll singer Shakin' Stevens, released in April 1981 from his album Shaky. It peaked at number 2 on the UK Singles Chart for four weeks behind Adam and the Ants' "Stand and Deliver".

Charts

Weekly charts

Year-end charts

Certifications and sales

References

1981 singles
Shakin' Stevens songs
Epic Records singles
1981 songs